George W. Smith House may refer to:

in the United States (by state)
George W. Smith House (Oak Park, Illinois), listed on the NRHP in Illinois
George W. Smith House (Elizabethtown, Kentucky), Elizabethtown, Kentucky, listed on the National Register of Historic Places in Hardin County, Kentucky
George W. Smith Homestead,	Mattawamkeag, Maine, listed on the National Register of Historic Places in Penobscot County, Maine
George W. Smith House (Geneva, Nebraska), Geneva, Nebraska, listed on the National Register of Historic Places in Fillmore County, Nebraska

See also
Smith House (disambiguation)